Cotovscoe is a commune and village in the Gagauz Autonomous Territorial Unit of the Republic of Moldova.  The 2004 census listed the commune as having a population of 989 people.   Gagauz total 944. Minorities included 11 Bulgarians, 22 Moldovans, 4 Russians, 7 Ukrainians and 1 'other nationality'.

Its geographical coordinates are 46° 9' 38" North, 28° 30' 49" East.

References

Communes of Gagauzia